Asaccus barani is a species of lizard in the family Phyllodactylidae. It is endemic to Turkey.

References

Asaccus
Reptiles of Turkey
Endemic fauna of Turkey
Reptiles described in 2011